Kelly Keeling was born on June 25, 1966, and is an American musician and songwriter. Keeling started playing at the age of 14 and began his career as the lead singer of the American heavy metal band Baton Rouge. Throughout his career Keeling  worked with major hard rock acts, wrote movie soundtracks and also played with Christian rock bands.

Biography
Kelly formed the band Balance in 2012 with guitarist/co- writer Kim Roy, (formerly of the band Kingdom), and reunited Baton Rouge for a new recording on Frontier Records, which was cancelled in 2013.

Discography

Studio albums
Giving Sight to the Eye (2005)
Lime Green Limousine  with Marc Zimmerman  (2010)
Mind Radio (2015)

with Baton Rouge
Shake Your Soul (1990)
Lights Out on the Playground (1991)
Baton Rouge (1997)

with John Norum
Another Destination (1995)
Worlds Away (1996)
"Terror Over Me" (2022)

with Carmine Appice's Guitar Zeus
Carmine Appice's Guitar Zeus (1995)
Guitar Zeus II:  Channel Mind Radio (1997)
Conquering Heroes (2009)

with Michael Schenker Group
The Unforgiven (1999)
The Unforgiven World Tour Live (1999)
"Big Deal (False Alarms)" (2006)

with King Kobra
Hollywood Trash (2001)

with Heaven and Earth
Windows to the World (2001)

with Erik Norlander
Music Machine (2003)
Stars Rain Down (2004)
Live in St. Petersburg (2006)
Hommage Symphonique (2007)

with George Lynch
Furious George (2004)

with Paris Keeling
End of Ride (2006)
End of Ride Revisited  (2009)

with O'2L
Eat a Pickle (2007)

with Foundry
Foundry (2015)

Guest appearances
Alice Cooper – Hey Stoopid (songwriting and backing vocals – 1991)
Blue Murder – Nothin' but Trouble (backing vocals, lead vocals on "I'm On Fire" – 1993)
Dokken – Long Way Home (songwriting – guitars on little girl I've found - there was a time song vocals acoustic. Among others keeling stamped..song and harmony vocals acoustic guitars2002)
Jack Ponti Presents – Volume 1 (compilation – 2003)
Dokken – Hell to Pay (songwriting – harmony vocals acoustic guitar 2004)
Lana Lane – Lady Macbeth (backing vocals – 2005)
Moonstone Project – Time to Take a Stand (guest vocalist – 2006)
JK Northrup – Wired in My Skin (guest vocalist – 2007)
The Screamin' Lords – Long Live Me (guest vocalist – 2007)
Liberty N' Justice – Independence Day (guest vocalist – 2007)
The Rocket Scientists – Looking Backward - The 2007 Sessions (guest vocalist- 2007)
Lana Lane – Gemini (backing vocals – 2007)
Don Dokken – Solitary (backing vocals four songs green Venice few others and acoustic guitars – 2008)
Trans-Siberian Orchestra – Night Castle (backing vocals – 2009)
Moonstone Project – Hidden in Time (guest vocalist – 2009)
 Liberty N' Justice – Light It Up (guest vocalist – 2010)
 Chris Bickley –  Tapestry of souls (guest vocalist  – 2012)
 FOUNDRY –  Calling Allah (guest guitarist Michael Guy – 2015)

Tribute albums
"Speed King" (Smoke on the Water: A Tribute to Deep Purple) (1994)
"Mean Mistreater" (A Tribute to Grand Funk Railroad...an American Band) (2000)
"Three Lock Box" (A Millennium Tribute to Sammy Hagar) (2006)

Soundtrack appearances

References

Living people
American male singers
American heavy metal singers
Blue Murder (band) members
King Kobra members
American performers of Christian music
Singers from Louisiana
Michael Schenker Group members
1968 births